Stephen Carpenter, born in Weatherford, Texas, and raised in Kansas City, Missouri, is an American writer, director, and cinematographer with nine films and two television works to his credit, and more in development.

Carpenter  has been writing since 7th grade.  He graduated from the University of California, Los Angeles School of Theater, Film and Television.  He lectures on writing and story structure at the University of Southern California's School of Cinematic Arts.

His screenplays include The Man starring Samuel L. Jackson and Eugene Levy, Blue Streak starring Martin Lawrence, and others. He has written and directed several thrillers, including Soul Survivors starring Eliza Dushku and Casey Affleck. His most recent (2011) creation is the NBC television series Grimm, which premiered in the 2011 fall season.

Carpenter's first novel, Killer, published in 2010 on Amazon Kindle was No. 1 on Amazon's Mystery/Thriller lists, and was characterized as "a blockbuster debut" by Entertainment Weekly. His latest book, Killer in the Hills, was published by Amazon in December 2011. , he was developing a one-hour mystery series for NBC.

He is currently working on several Kindle Vella series, Killer be Killed and The Grimm Curse.

References

External links
 

21st-century American novelists
American cinematographers
Film producers from Missouri
American male screenwriters
Film directors from Texas
Living people
People from Weatherford, Texas
Writers from Kansas City, Missouri
Novelists from Texas
UCLA Film School alumni
USC School of Cinematic Arts faculty
Year of birth missing (living people)
21st-century American male writers
Novelists from Missouri
Screenwriters from California
Screenwriters from Texas
Screenwriters from Missouri
Film producers from Texas
21st-century American screenwriters